McIntosh County is a county in the U.S. state of North Dakota. As of the 2020 census, the population was 2,530. Its county seat is Ashley. The county is notable for being the county with the highest percentage of German-Americans in the United States, with over 76% of the county's residents being of German descent as of 2010.

History
The Dakota Territory legislature created the county on March 9, 1883, with areas partitioned from Campbelll, Logan, and McPherson counties, and with some previously-unorganized areas. It was named for Edward H. McIntosh, a territorial legislator at the time. The county seat was originally Hoskins, but changed in 1888 after everything in Hoskins but the school was moved three miles east to the new Soo Line Railroad townsite of Ashley. The county government was not organized at that date, but the new county was not attached to another county for judicial or administrative purposes. Its government was organized on October 4, 1884.

Geography
McIntosh County lies on the south line of North Dakota. Its south boundary line abuts the north boundary line of the state of South Dakota. The terrain consists of rolling hills dotted with lakes and ponds, and with occasional protuberances. The terrain slopes to the south, with its highest point on the north line at 2,156' (657m) ASL.

Major highways
  North Dakota Highway 3
  North Dakota Highway 11
  North Dakota Highway 13

Adjacent counties

 Logan County - north
 LaMoure County - northeast
 Dickey County - east
 McPherson County, South Dakota - south
 Campbell County, South Dakota - southwest
 Emmons County - west

Protected areas

 Camp Lake State Game Management Area
 Doyle Memorial State Recreation Area
 Green Lake State Game Management Area
 McIntosh County State Wildlife Management Area
 National Waterfowl Production Area

Lakes

 Camp Lake
 Coldwater Lake
 Goose Lake
 Green Lake
 Kislingburg Lake
 Lake Hoskins
 May Lake
 Miller Lake
 Pudwill Lake
 Salt Lake
 Tschetter Lake

Demographics

2000 census

As of the 2020 census, there were 3,390 people, 1,467 households, and 975 families in the county. The population density was 3.48/sqmi (1.34/km2). There were 1,853 housing units at an average density of 1.90/sqmi (0.73/km2). The racial makeup of the county was 98.88% White, 0.15% Native American, 0.29% Asian, 0.03% Pacific Islander, 0.09% from other races, and 0.56% from two or more races. 0.83% of the population were Hispanic or Latino of any race. 82.2% were of German and 5.0% American ancestry.

There were 1,467 households, out of which 22.30% had children under the age of 18 living with them, 60.30% were married couples living together, 3.50% had a female householder with no husband present, and 33.50% were non-families. 32.00% of all households were made up of individuals, and 19.90% had someone living alone who was 65 years of age or older. The average household size was 2.19 and the average family size was 2.75.

The county population contained 19.40% under the age of 18, 4.60% from 18 to 24, 19.40% from 25 to 44, 22.40% from 45 to 64, and 34.20% who were 65 years of age or older. The median age was 51 years. For every 100 females there were 91.50 males. For every 100 females age 18 and over, there were 91.70 males.

The median income for a household in the county was $26,389, and the median income for a family was $31,771. Males had a median income of $22,153 versus $16,743 for females. The per capita income for the county was $15,018. About 10.60% of families and 15.40% of the population were below the poverty line, including 14.50% of those under age 18 and 18.90% of those age 65 or over.

2010 census

As of the 2010 census, there were 2,809 people, 1,307 households, and 800 families in the county. The population density was 2.88/sqmi (1.11/km2). There were 1,858 housing units at an average density of 1.91/sqmi (0.74/km2). The racial makeup of the county was 98.1% white, 0.4% Asian, 0.4% American Indian, 0.2% black or African American, 0.2% from other races, and 0.6% from two or more races. Those of Hispanic or Latino origin made up 1.4% of the population. In terms of ancestry, 76.8% were German, 26.9% were Russian, 6.2% were Norwegian, and 5.2% were American.

Of the 1,307 households, 19.4% had children under the age of 18 living with them, 55.0% were married couples living together, 3.5% had a female householder with no husband present, 38.8% were non-families, and 36.2% of all households were made up of individuals. The average household size was 2.07 and the average family size was 2.66. The median age was 52.7 years.

The median income for a household in the county was $34,904 and the median income for a family was $46,198. Males had a median income of $35,200 versus $23,594 for females. The per capita income for the county was $22,608. About 9.2% of families and 13.9% of the population were below the poverty line, including 9.7% of those under age 18 and 20.2% of those age 65 or over.

Communities

Cities

 Ashley (county seat)
 Lehr (partly in Logan County)
 Venturia
 Wishek
 Zeeland

Township
 Roloff

Politics
McIntosh County is a powerfully Republican county. The only Democrats to carry McIntosh County have been Franklin D. Roosevelt in 1936 and 1932, plus Al Smith in 1928. In 1920, 1940, 1944. and 1952 elections the Republican Presidential candidate received over ninety percent of the county's vote. Although shifting somewhat Democratic in more recent Presidential elections, John McCain received nearly sixty percent of the county's vote in the 2008 U.S. presidential election. Donald Trump won seventy-seven percent of the vote in 2016, the best result in the county since Ronald Reagan.

The county is represented in the US House of Representatives by Republican Kevin Cramer. As part of District 28 it is represented in the North Dakota Senate by Robert S. Erbele (R) and in the North Dakota House of Representatives by Mike Brandenburg (R) and Jeffery Magrum (R).

See also
 National Register of Historic Places listings in McIntosh County ND

References

External links
 McIntosh County map, North Dakota DOT

 
1884 establishments in Dakota Territory
Populated places established in 1884